Evolution of the Spirit is the fourth album by Italian singer-songwriter Perseo Miranda. It contains four tracks, in gothic metal style.

Track listing
"Evolution of the Spirit, Part 1"
"Evolution of the Spirit, Part 2"
"The Questions"
"Past, Present and Future"

References

External links
 Perseo Miranda official website
 Perseo Miranda official Myspace site

2007 albums
Perseo Miranda albums